Agata Katarzyna Suszka (born 27 September 1971) is a Polish biathlete. She competed at the 1992, 1994 and the 1998 Winter Olympics.

References

1971 births
Living people
Biathletes at the 1992 Winter Olympics
Biathletes at the 1994 Winter Olympics
Biathletes at the 1998 Winter Olympics
Polish female biathletes
Olympic biathletes of Poland
People from Cieszyn County
Universiade silver medalists for Poland
Universiade medalists in biathlon
Competitors at the 1993 Winter Universiade
Competitors at the 1999 Winter Universiade